Kompull Boros Mok Pee is a 1972 Khmer film directed by Tat Somnang. The film stars Kong Som Eun, Eli Bloch, and Vichara Dany.

Plot 
Kong Som Eun pretends to be another man, practicing his romantic advantages, to test his lovers, Vichara Dany and Som Bopha, and exhibit whether they truly love only him and no other, like the other man he is disguised as.

Cast 
Kong Som Eun
Vichara Dany
Kim Nova
Lim Sophoan
Soam Bopha
Trente deux
Map Noya

Soundtrack

References 
 

Cambodian drama films
Khmer-language films
1972 films